Ouachita School District is a public school district based in Donaldson, Arkansas, United States. The Ouachita School District provides early childhood, elementary and secondary education for more than 550 prekindergarten through grade 12 students at its two facilities and serving  of land in, Hot Spring County, including Donaldson, Friendship, and a portion of Midway.

Ouachita School District is accredited by the Arkansas Department of Education (ADE).

Schools 
 Ouachita High School—serving more than 175 students in grades 7 through 12.
 Ouachita Elementary School—serving more than 300 students in pre-kindergarten through grade 6.

References

External links 
 

School districts in Arkansas
Education in Hot Spring County, Arkansas